Alexei Borisovich Kovalev  (born August 10, 1973 in Tambov, USSR) is a Russian football referee. In his youth, he was a football player. He played as a midfielder for the amateur team FC Lokomotiv Tambov.

Kovalev began his refereeing career in 1993 and, since 2006, he officiates matches in the Russian championship, at a regional level. He is the Chairman of the Board of Tambov Football Federation referees. in 2008, Kovalev took third place in the contest Golden mantle, awarded to the best referees of Russia.

References

External links
 Alexei Kovalev at TambovSport.ru 
 
 Alexei Kovalev referee profile at ClubSpartak.ru 
 

1973 births
Living people
Sportspeople from Tambov
Russian football referees
Russian footballers
Association footballers not categorized by position